Mount Ida, also known as Kela7scen, is a  high mountain of Shuswap Highland located in the southern portion of Columbia-Shuswap Regional District. The mountain resembles a defensive palisade and overlooks the city of Salmon Arm from the south.

The mountain has held special importance for inhabitants of the area since time immemorial. “Known to the Secwepemc people as Kela7scen for its funny coloured rocks, the mountain is considered by Secwepemc people to be sacred ground.”

References 

One-thousanders of British Columbia
Columbia-Shuswap Regional District